I Can't Imagine is the thirteenth studio album by American country music singer/songwriter, Shelby Lynne. The album was released on May 5, 2015 by Rounder Records. It peaked at No. 5 on the Billboard Folk Albums chart.

Critical reception

The Metacritic score for this album is 77/100 and, as of 28 March 2020, says the album has "Generally favorable reviews based on 11 Critic Reviews."

Thom Jurek of AllMusic concludes his review with, "I Can't Imagine is confident, assured, and fiercely independent. What ties its various threads together is the songwriter's unguarded heart, expressed by her near iconic vocal prowess, and we've come to expect nothing less from Lynne."

Meredith Ochs reviews I Can't Imagine for NPR and begins, "With her voice alone, Shelby Lynne conveys a devastating spectrum of feelings - the pain of lost love and loneliness delivered in sweet, sultry tones. Add steel guitar and wide, open arrangements, as she does on her new album, and she turns emotional confusion into something so achingly beautiful that you don't want it to end."

Sam C. Mac of Slant Magazine gives the album 3 out of a possible 5 stars and concludes his review with, "Had she toned down some idiosyncrasies and worried a handful of these songs past what sounds like their draft stages, I Can't Imagine could’ve been a real coup for Lynne, proving that the record labels need her as decisively as she’s proven she doesn’t need them."

Hal Horowitz of American Songwriter gives the album 3½ out of a possible 5 stars and writes, "it's the pure Dusty Springfield soul of "Sold the Devil (Sunshine)" and the slinky swamp of "Be in the Now" that finds Lynne at her loosest and most natural. A few more tunes in this vein would be welcome, but everything here captures the classy, sometimes sassy and always heartfelt essence that makes Shelby Lynne one of her generation’s most passionate and determined voices."

Stephen L. Betts reviews the album for Rolling Stone and writes, "For her 13th full-length album, I Can't Imagine, the Grammy winner once again draws on her roots and her myriad influences, delivering 10 new tunes she has written or co-written."

Track listing

Musicians

"Paper Van Gogh"
Shelby Lynne – Vocals, Acoustic Guitar, Harmony Vocals
Ed Maxwell – Upright Acoustic Bass
Ben Peeler – Acoustic Guitar, Electric Guitar
Michael Jerome – Drums, Percussion
Brendan Buckley – Percussion
Christopher Joyner – Piano

"Back Door Front Porch"
Shelby Lynne – Vocals, Acoustic Guitar, Backing Vocals
Ed Maxwell – Upright Acoustic Bass, Moog Synthesizer
Clarence Greenwood – Backing Vocals
Michael Jerome – Drums
Pete Donnelly – Hammond Organ
Ben Peeler – Weissenborn Slide Guitar, Electric Guitar

"Sold The Devil (Sunshine)"
Shelby Lynne – Vocals, Backing Vocals
Michael Jerome – Drums, Backing Vocals
Ed Maxwell – Electric Bass, Backing Vocals
Ben Peeler – Electric Guitar
Pete Donnelly – WurlitzerOrgan
Brendan Buckley – Percussion

"Son Of A Gun"
Shelby Lynne – Vocals, Acoustic Guitar
Ed Maxwell – Upright Acoustic Bass, Upright Bass Percussion
Ben Peeler – Acoustic Guitar, Electric Guitar, Lap Steel Guitar, Twelve-String Acoustic Guitar
Michael Jerome – Drums
Brendan Buckley – Percussion
Pete Donnelly – Piano

"Down Here"
Shelby Lynne – Vocals, Acoustic Guitar
Clarence Greenwood – Backing Vocals
Michael Jerome – Drums, Backing Vocals
Ed Maxwell – Electric Bass, Backing Vocals
Pete Donnelly – Electric Guitar
Ben Peeler – Electric Guitar, Pedal Steel Guitar
Christopher Joyner – Wurlitzer Organ, B3 Organ
Brendan Buckley – Percussion

"Love Is Strong"
Shelby Lynne – Vocals, Acoustic Guitar
Ed Maxwell – Upright Acoustic Bass, Moog Synthesizer
Brendan Buckley – Drums
Michael Jerome – Drums
Ben Peeler – Electric Guitar
Christopher Joyner – Piano

"Better"
Shelby Lynne – Vocals, Acoustic Guitar, Backing Vocals
Ben Peeler – Acoustic Guitar, Lap Steel Guitar, Rickenbacker Twelve-String Guitar
Pete Donnelly – Acoustic Guitar, Piano, Vocals
Clarence Greenwood – Backing Vocals
Ed Maxwell – Bass, Organ
Michael Jerome – Drums, Percussion, Vocals
Brendan Buckley – Percussion

"Be In The Now"
Shelby Lynne – Vocals, Acoustic Guitar
Ed Maxwell – Upright Acoustic Bass
Ben Peeler – Acoustic Guitar, Weissenborn Slide Guitar
Michael Jerome – Drums, Percussion
Christopher Joyner – Wurlitzer Organ
Brendan Buckley – Percussion

"Following You"
Shelby Lynne – Vocals, Acoustic Guitar, Piano
Ben Peeler – Acoustic Guitar, Pedal Steel Guitar
Leni Stern – Lute (N'goni Intro)

"I Can't Imagine"
Shelby Lynne – Vocals, Acoustic Guitar, Backing Vocals
Michael Jerome – Drums
Ed Maxwell – Electric Bass
Pete Donnelly – Electric Guitar, Backing Vocals
Ben Peeler – Pedal Steel Guitar, Acoustic Guitar, Twelve-String Acoustic Guitar
Christopher Joyner – Piano

Production

Producer – Shelby Lynne
A&R – Scott Billington
Booking – Bruce Solar, Ronnie Lapone
Associate Producer – Ben Peeler
Package Design – Andrew Pham
Executive Producer – John Burk
Management – Elizabeth Jordan
Mastered By – Clint Holley, Paul Blakemore
Mixed by Shelby Lynne
Mixed and recorded by Seth Presant
Photography by Alexandra Hedison
Recorded by Chris Rondinella
Recorded by Steve Reynolds

Track information and credits adapted the album's liner notes.

Charts

References

External links
Shelby Lynne Official Site
Rounder Records Official Site

2015 albums
Shelby Lynne albums
Rounder Records albums